Nacional Atlético Clube, more commonly referred to as Nacional de Rolândia, is a Brazilian professional association football club in Rolândia, Paraná which currently plays in Série D, the fourth tier of Brazilian football, as well as in the Campeonato Paranaense Segunda Divisão, the second division of the Paraná state football league.

Founded on April 28, 1947, in 2004 the club competed in the Brazilian Championship Third Division.

History
In 1998, Nacional won the Campeonato Paranaense Third Division, and in 2003 the club won the Campeonato Paranaense Second Division, finishing ahead of CIanorte, ADAP, Marechal, Dois Vizinhos and Foz do Iguaçu in the final stage.

In 2004, the club competed in the Brazilian Championship Third Division, but was eliminated in the first stage.

Titles
 Campeonato Paranaense Second Division: 2003, 2008
 Campeonato Paranaense Third Division: 1998

References

External links
 Official site
 Nacional Atlético Clube at Arquivo de Clubes

Association football clubs established in 1947
Football clubs in Paraná (state)
1947 establishments in Brazil
Rolândia